Uładzisłau Kazłouski (Belarusian:Уладзіслаў Казлоўскі, 29 June 1896 – 18 November 1943) was a Belarusian publicist, publisher, poet, critic journalist, activist and politician.

Early life 
Kazłouski was born in the Polish village of Zalesie, Sokółka County. He studied at the Catholic seminary in Vilnius from 1916 to 1919. Upon returning from school in Vilnius, Kazłouski was confronted by the Belarusian national revival.

Career 
Kazłouski became an organizer for Belarusian schools in the district of Sokółka. He was a member of the leadership of the Belarusian Party in Włościańska. Kazłouski later became an instructor at the Belarusian National Committee in Minsk. As an instructor, he led cultural and social activities in the district of Ihumeńskim.

In the early 1920s, Kazłouski joined the newly formed Belarusian battalions. Early in his career, Kazłouski was commanded to enter the cadet school of Warsaw. Upon graduating, Kazłouski became a shooting instructor at a Belarusian battalion. Kazłouski served in the Polish Army from 1921 to 1930,  leaving as a reserve lieutenant.

Kazłouski settled in Vilnius. There he organized the Gymnastics Society "Hajsak" and published articles on the physical culture of Belarusian youth. At the same time, he served as secretary of the Belarusian National Committee and was active in the Belarusian Institute of Economy and Culture.

In November 1933, Kazłouski and Fabian Akińczycem founded the Belarusian National-Socialist Party. Kazłouski edited its press organ New Plot Type, which was confiscated multiple times by the Polish authorities. Up until 1937, Kazłouski published numerous articles as well as poems for the party's press under the pseudonym "Kazłouszczyk".

In 1934, Kazłouski became secretary of the Belarusian National Committee in Vilnius. In the Autumn of 1939, he became secretary of the Belarusian self-help groups where he worked with the Lithuanian Red Cross.

During World War II he worked together with the German Nazi Party.

In the Autumn of 1941, Kazłouski moved to Minsk. By 1942 he began the publishing of "Biełaruski hasty". Alongside Akińczycem, Kazłouski attempted to reactivate the Belarusian Party of National-Socialism, but failed to obtain the consent of the German authorities. Kazłouski later co-organized and took part in the leadership of the Belarusian People's Self-Help.

References

1896 births
1943 deaths
People from Sokółka County
People from Sokolsky Uyezd
Belarusian people of Polish descent
Belarusian Roman Catholics
Belarusian male writers
Belarusian male poets
Belarusian journalists
Belarusian politicians
Belarusian activists
20th-century journalists
Belarusian collaborators with Nazi Germany
Executed collaborators with Nazi Germany